Rhododendron subg. Choniastrum is a subgenus of the genus Rhododendron, originally a section of subgenus Azaleastrum it was elevated to subgenus rank after cladistic analysis revealed that together with Rhododendron it formed a major clade, distinct from other sections of Azaleastrum.

The subgenus includes eleven species, including;

 Rhododendron championae
 Rhododendron hancockii
 Rhododendron latoucheae
 Rhododendron moulmainense
 Rhododendron stamineum

References

Bibliography 

Choniastrum
Plant subgenera
Taxa named by Adrien René Franchet